Mijuredanda is a town and Village Development Committee  in Kaski District in Gandaki Province of northern-central Nepal. At the time of the 1991 Nepal census it had a population of 4,394 persons living in 907 individual households.

References

Populated places in Kaski District